The 2015–16 season was the 76th season of Wisła Kraków in the Ekstraklasa.

Season review

Squad

Transfers

Summer transfer window

Arrivals 
 The following players moved to Wisła.

Departures 
 The following players moved from Wisła.

Winter transfer window

Arrivals 
 The following players moved to Wisła.

Departures 
 The following players moved from Wisła.

Competitions

Friendlies

Ekstraklasa

Results summary – regular season

Results by round

Regular season

Matches

League table

Regular season

Results summary – relegation round

Results by round

Relegation round

Matches

Relegation round

Polish Cup

Squad statistics

Appearances and goals

|-
|}

Goalscorers

Assists

Disciplinary record

References

Wisła Kraków seasons
Wisla Krakow